Douglas Joseph Lennox (21 January 1938 – 28 November 2015) was a Canadian actor, writer and radio personality, who was perhaps best known for his book Now You Know, The Big Book of Answers and his many appearances in movies such as X-Men and Police Academy.

Career
Lennox originally began his career in radio in 1965. 

His first television credit was in Juliette and Friends as the co-host of the series, he has also appeared in several other television series, including The New Avengers, Alfred Hitchcock Presents,  My Secret Identity, The Hitchhiker, E.N.G., Once a Thief,  Earth: Final Conflict, Honey, I Shrunk the Kids: The TV Show, Cold Squad, The Famous Jett Jackson, Relic Hunter, A Nero Wolfe Mystery,  Odyssey 5, 1-800-Missing, Soul Food, The Newsroom, Darcy's Wild Life and The Jon Dore Television Show.

Lennoux has also appeared in several films through his career including his most notable credits in X-Men and Police Academy. He has also appeared in Police Academy 3: Back in Training, The Boy in Blue, X-Men: The Last Stand, Harlan County War, Against the Ropes, Mercy, Self Defense and Apocalypse IV: Judgment.

In 2000, Lennox was cast as P.T. Boomer in Britt Allcroft's fantasy adventure film, Thomas and the Magic Railroad. But was later cut from the final film due to test audiences saying his character is too scary for younger viewers.

His final acting credit was in the 2009 film, Deadliest Sea. Where he played a Pilot of an airplane in the film.

Death
Lennox died in his sleep on 28 November 2015 in Toronto, Ontario, Canada, at the age of 77.

Filmography

Film

Television

References

External links

1938 births
2015 deaths
Canadian male film actors
Canadian radio personalities
Canadian non-fiction writers
Male actors from Greater Sudbury
Writers from Greater Sudbury